The Fertilizer Fund scam is a Philippine political controversy involving accusations that Agriculture Undersecretary Jocelyn Bolante diverted ₱728 million in fertilizer funds to the 2004 election campaign of President Gloria Macapagal Arroyo.

Background
When Operation Big Bird concluded in late 1986, the Philippine government was able to identify and recover US$356 million from the Swiss Bank deposits of Ferdinand Marcos and wife Imelda Marcos. While the money sat in a Philippine government account in Switzerland, successive administration debated what to do with the funds. By 1998 the funds had grown to $570 million with interest, and were transferred to an escrow account in Philippine National Bank. In July 2003 the Supreme Court of the Philippines ruled with finality that the funds were ill-gotten and thus are considered public funds. Pres. Arroyo announced that the money in accordance with the law on recovered ill-gotten wealth from the Marcos family will be used for the Agriculture Sector and Agrarian Reform.

Details
In March 2004, the Philippine Daily Inquirer reported that Senator Panfilo Lacson accused President Arroyo of vote-buying by authorizing the release of ₱728 million. The money was supposedly to be used for the purchase of fertilizers which would be distributed to the local officials.

After a year, an episode of The Probe Team reported that some farmers claimed that they did not receive fertilizers from the funds released by the Department of Agriculture. A Philippine Center for Investigative Journalism (PCIJ) special report was released later saying that billions of farm funds were used to fund Arroyo's presidential campaign.

Jocelyn Bolante
Jocelyn Bolante was undersecretary of the Department of Agriculture when the fertilizer fund scam erupted in March 2004. He is accused of diverting at least ₱728 million in fertilizer funds to President Arroyo's 2004 election campaign. Bolante resigned from his post in September 2004.

When the controversy broke out in 2006, Bolante fled to the U.S. and sought asylum, but his petition was denied by the U.S. courts and he was eventually deported. He arrived in the Philippines on October 28, 2008. Upon his arrival, the Senate effected the warrant on Bolante, initially holding him under hospital arrest. After a month, he appeared in the Senate for the first time. He denies that the money was misused, stating that there was no fertilizer scam despite the findings of the Commission on Audit that there was 'excessive overpricing' of the liquid fertilizer purchased by Bolante's proponents. He cleared President Arroyo of any direct involvement, including the congressmen and other local officials implicated in the fertilizer fund scam. He testified that it was former Secretary of Agriculture Luis Lorenzo who requested the release of the fertilizer fund.

Investigation
The Philippine Senate Committee on Agriculture in March 2006 recommended the filing of plunder charges against Bolante and Lorenzo, along with other officials of the Department of Agriculture. A copy of the inquiry was also sent to the Anti-Money Laundering Council (AMLC). The chair of the committee, Senator Ramon Magsaysay Jr., said that Arroyo should be held accountable for mismanagement of the P728-million fertilizer fund.

The AMLC began its own investigation in September 2006 after the Philippine National Bank revealed it had received "2 suspicious transaction reports." The investigation showed that a Bolante-chaired firm, Livelihood Corp., transferred PHP172.6 million to Molugan Foundation Inc. and PHP40 million to Assembly of Gracious Samaritans Foundation, Inc. (AGS). Molugan Foundation also transferred PHP38 million to AGS.

Task Force Abono in 2008 looked into the involvement of some 140 congressmen in the Ginintuang Masaganang Ani (GMA) program of the Department of Agriculture.

On May 2, 2014, Office of the Ombudsman dismissed the case against Arroyo, who was at the time under hospital arrest for alleged misuse of Philippine Charity Sweepstakes Office funds.

The Sandiganbayan (Philippine anti-graft court) launched its investigation into the fertilizer fund scam in 2016.

See also
Impeachment of Merceditas Gutierrez
Marlene Garcia-Esperat, a journalist who was killed in March 2005 for her investigation into the scam

External links
Letter of Jovito Salonga to Pres. Gloria Macapagal Arroyo, January 30, 2006

References

Political scandals in the Philippines
Presidency of Gloria Macapagal Arroyo